Torsten Samuelsson (born 16 March 1938) is a Swedish cross-country skier. He competed in the 30 km event at the 1964 Winter Olympics.

Cross-country skiing results
All results are sourced from the International Ski Federation (FIS).

Olympic Games

References

External links
 

1938 births
Living people
Swedish male cross-country skiers
Olympic cross-country skiers of Sweden
Cross-country skiers at the 1964 Winter Olympics
People from Dalarna